Marie de Gournay (6 October 1565, Paris – 13 July 1645) was a French writer, who wrote a novel and a number of other literary compositions, including The Equality of Men and Women (Égalité des hommes et des femmes, 1622)  and The Ladies' Grievance (Grief des dames, 1626). She insisted that women should be educated. Gournay was also an editor and commentator of Michel de Montaigne. After Montaigne's death, Gournay edited and published his Essays.

Life 
She was born in Paris in 1565. Her father, Guillaume Le Jars, was treasurer to King Henry III of France. In 1568 he obtained feudal rights to the Gournay estate in Picardy, and in 1573, after he purchased the Neufvy estate, he became Seigneur de Neufvy et de Gournay. The family moved to Gournay-sur-Aronde after her father's sudden death in 1577.

Gournay was an autodidact. She studied the humanities and taught herself Latin. Her studies led her to discover the works of Michel de Montaigne. She met him 1588 by chance in Paris and became his "adopted daughter". She published her first book in 1594, Le Proumenoir de Monsieur de Montaigne.

After her mother's death in 1591, Marie moved to Paris, leaving the family home to her brother Charles, who was forced to sell it in 1608. Montaigne died the following year, and his widow, Françoise de la Chassaigne, provided Gournay with a copy of the Essays and charged her with its publication. In 1595 Gournay published the first posthumous edition of his Essays and in 1598 she published a revised edition. She settled in Paris, determined to earn a living from writing. She published a timely discussion on the education of children in 1608, Bienvenue à Monseigneur le Duc d'Anjou. This work brought her to wider attention among Paris intellectuals. Her 1610 work Adieu de l'ame du Roy de France et de Navarre caused a scandal because it defended Jesuits, who were suspected of having conspired to assassinate King Henry IV. Gournay was attacked in the satirical pamphlet The Anti-Gournay and was pictured as an old shrew.

In Paris, Marie de Gournay met Henri Louis Habert de Montmor and the scholar Justus Lipsius presented her to Europe as a woman of letters. Gournay found herself protectors by writing for Queen Margo, Henry IV of France, Marie de Médicis, Louis XIII, the marquise de Guercheville, the ministers Villeroy and Jeannin. Queen Margo became her patron. Gournay was invited to the Queen's  royal salon and received financial support on a quarterly basis.

She translated works by Sallust, Ovid, Virgil, and Tacitus. Gournay also wrote verses about her cat Léonore (also the name of Montaigne's daughter) and Joan of Arc, adapted Ronsard, wrote on the instruction of princes, and criticized the Précieuses. In 1619 she published the translation Versions de quelques pièces de Virgile, Tacite, Salluste with a preface in which she opposed François de Malherbe's view that the French language had to be purged. Gournay was accused of being ridiculous, past-orientated, and of being an old maid. In turn, Gournay published a fierce defense of women's rights in 1622, Égalité des Hommes et des Femmes, which she dedicated to Queen Anne d'Autriche. In 1624 she published a bold revision of Pierre de Ronsard's poem Remerciement, au Roy.
   
In her 1626 novel Le Promenoir de M. de Montaigne qui traite de l’amour dans l’œuvre de Plutarque she explored the dangers women face when they become dependent on men. A collection of her works was published in 1626 entitled L'ombre de la damoiselle de Gournay. She moved to an apartment on the rue Saint Honoré and helped to establish the French Academy. The small pension granted to her by Cardinal Richelieu allowed her to publish a 1635 edition of Montaigne's Essays. In 1641 she published another collection of her own works Les Advis, ou les Presens de la Demoiselle de Gournay. She died in 1645, aged 79, and is buried at the Saint-Eustache Church in Paris. Marie de Gournay is now recognized as the first woman in France to contribute to literary criticism and one of the first to argue forcibly on the equality of men and women.  Her final collected works ran to nearly 1,000 pages.

Views on women's education 
Gournay's arguments for women's right to education had a religious underpinning. Gournay was Roman Catholic and known as an opponent of the Protestant movement in the French wars of religion. She advocated for women's education in two treatises, Égalité des Hommes et des Femmes (The Equality of Men and Women), published 1622, and Grief des Dames (The Ladies' Grievance) published 1626. She argued that men and women were equal because "the virtue of men and virtue of women are the same thing, since God bestowed on them the same creation and the same honor".

"Happy are you, reader, if you do not belong to this sex to which all good is forbidden"

In The Equality of Men and Women Gournay structured her argument similarly to Christine de Pizan, and started by profiling great women of the past to demonstrate the ability of women to learn. She avoided the discussion on superiority of one sex over the other by stressing the equality of men and women. But she attacked the notion that great women simply resembled great men. She argued that it was no surprise that women were perceived as incompetent, ignorant, and focused on their bodies, given that women received little education. Gournay argued that given the same opportunities, privileges, and education as men, women could equal men's accomplishments. In The Ladies' Grievance Gournay complained that women did not own property, exercise freedom, or have access to public office. She argued that educated women had the right to be heard, just as educated men do. Like René Descartes she separated the mind from the body, and argued that women were as capable as men.

Works 
Adieu de l'âme du Roy de France et de Navarre Henry le Grand à la Royne, avec la défence des Pères Jésuites / par la damoiselle de G.
L'ombre de la damoiselle de Gournay (1626, 1634 and 1641)
Les advis ou Les présens de la demoiselle de Gournay (1634)
Les essais de Michel seigneur de Montaigne : nouvelle édition exactement purgée des défauts des precedentes, selon le vray original, et enrichie & augmentée aux marges du nom des autheurs qui y sont citez, & de la version de leurs passages, avec des observations très importantes & necessaires pour le soulagement du lecteur, ensemble la vie de l'auteur, & deux tables, l'une des chapitres, & l'autre des principales matières, de beaucoup plus ample & plus utile que celles des dernieres éditions / [Henri Estienne] ; [Marie de Jars de Gournay]
First volume of her complete works (1641) was published in 1997 by Rodopi

Publications
Œuvres complètes : Les advis ou Les présens de la demoiselle de Gournay ; T. Du Bray, 1634  Lire en ligne sur Gallica
avant 1588 : un sonnet et une ode dans les « Regrets funèbres sur la mort d'Aymée ». In Œuvres de Pierre de Brach (Le Tombeau d'Aymée)
 1594 : Le Proumenoir de Monsieur de Montaigne
 1595 : Préface sur les Essais de Michel, seigneur de Montaigne Lire en ligne sur gallica, in Les Essais de Michel Seigneur de Montaigne
 1595 : hommage en prose à Jean de Sponde, dans Response du Feu Sieur de Sponde...
 1598 : Preface sur les Essais de Michel, seigneur de Montaigne, in Les Essais de Michel Seigneur de Montaigne
 1608 : Bienvenue de Monseigneur le duc d'Anjou
 1610 : Adieu de l'Ame du Roy de France et de Navarre Henry le Grand, avec la Défense des Peres Jesuites
 1619 : Versions de quelques pièces de Virgile, Tacite, Salluste, avec l'Institution de Monseigneur, frere unique du Roy (comprend également un « traicté sur la Poësie »).
 1620 : Eschantillons de Virgile
 1620 : deux poèmes dans Les Muses en deuil
 1621 : Traductions. Partie du Quatriesme de l'Eneide, avec une oraison de Tacite, et une de Saluste
 1622 : Égalité des Hommes et des Femmes
 1624 : Remerciement, au Roy
 1626 : L’ombre de la Damoiselle de Gournay – œuvre composée de mélanges – L’homme est l’ombre d’un songe & son œuvre est son ombre qui comprend :
...
 1628 : trois poèmes, in Recueil de plusieurs inscriptions proposées pour remplir les Tables d'attente estans sous les statues du Roy Charles VII et de la Pucelle d'Orléans...
 1634 : Les Advis, ou les Presens de la Demoiselle de Gournay (ajoute à L'Ombre : Discours sur ce livre à Sophrosine, Oraison du Roy à S. Louys durant le siège de Rhé, Première delivrance de Casal, De la temerité et la traduction du VIe livre de l'Énéide).
 1635 : un poème, in Le Sacrifice des Muses
 1635 : un poème, in Le Parnasse royal
 1641 : réédition des Advis
 1642 : deux épigrammes, in le Jardin des Muses
 1644 : une épigramme, in l'Approbation du Parnasse qui précède Les Chevilles de Me Adam Menuisier de Nevers

Bibliography
 Conroy, Derval. 'A Defence and Illustration of Marie de Gournay: Bayle’s Reception of ‘Cette Savante Demoiselle’, French Studies Bulletin, 40.152 (2019): 51–54. https://doi.org/10.1093/frebul/ktz009
 Conroy, Derval; 'Marie de Gournay’s “Advis à quelques gens d’Église” and the Early Modern Rigorist Debate. Romanic Review 112.3 (2021): 423–36. doi: https://doi.org/10.1215/00358118-9377342
 Dezon-Jones Elyane, Marie de Gournay. Fragments d’un discours féminin, Paris, José Corti, 1988.
 Fogel Michèle, Marie de Gournay, itinéraires d’une femme savante, Paris, Fayard, 2004.
 
 Les historiettes de Tallemant des Réaux, t. II, p. 124-128, Paris, 1834.
 Œuvres complètes réalisées par J.-C. Arnould, E. Berriot-Salvadore, M.-C. Bichard-Thomine, C. Blum, A. L. Franchetti, V. Worth-Stylianou, Paris, Honoré Champion, 2002. 
 Égalité des hommes et des femmes, suivi de Grief des Dames, édition établie par Claude Pinganaud et présentée par Séverine Auffret, Paris, Arléa, 2008.
 Beaulieu J.P., Fournier H. "Pratiques Dialogiques et réécriture dans l'oeuvre de Marie de Gournay", Neophilologus, volume 82, number 3 (1998), 357–367, DOI:10.1023/A:1004225101249.
 Noiset Marie-Thérèse, "Marie de Gournay et le caprice des siècles", Études françaises, vol. 29, n° 3, 1993, p. 193-205. Texte intégral.
 Dezon-Jones Elyane, "Marie de Gournay" in Writings by Pre-Revolutionary French Women, Anne R. Larsen, Colette H. Winn, New York, Garland, 1999, 237–42.
 Freeman Ring, Lynn Wendy,  'In Her Own Fashion': Marie de Gournay and the Fabrication of the Writer's Persona, 2007. texte intégral.
 Frelick Nancy, "(Re)Fashoning Marie de Gournay" in La Femme au XVIIe siècle. Actes du colloque de Vancouver. University of British Columbia. 5-7 octobre 2000 édités par Richard G. Hodgson, Tübingen, Gunter Narr, 2002. https://books.google.com/books?id=UY8ONbC9l9ECpg=PP1 extrais.
 Venesoen Constant, "Mademoiselle de Gournay" in Études sur la Littérature féminine du XVIIe siècle,Birmingham, Summa, 1990,p. 13-42 Texte intégral
 Maryanne Cline Horowitz, "Marie de Gournay, Editor of the Essais of Michel de Montaigne : A Case-Study in Mentor-Protegee Friendship", The Sixteenth Century Journal, vol. 17, n°3, autumn, 1986, . texte disponible.
 Poudérou Robert, Parce que c'était lui, parce que c'était moi, pièce de théâtre parue en 1992 mettant en scène Michel de Montaigne, Marie de Gournay et Françoise de La Chassaigne Dossier de presse.
 Jean-Claude Idée, Parce que c'était lui, pièce de théâtre parue en 2014 dans les Cahiers des Universités Populaires du Théâtre et jouée au Théâtre Montparnasse, à Paris.
 Marie de Gournay, "Escritos sobre la igualdad y en defensa de las mujeres" M. Cabré i Pairet & E. Rubio Hernández (Eds.) Spanish translation by M. Cabré i Pairet, E. Rubio Hernández & E. Teixidor Aránegui. Madrid, CSIC, 2014. http://libros.csic.es/product_info.php?products_id=772.
 Jenny Diski, "Apology for the Woman Writing", Virago Press, 2008  : a work of historical fiction based on the life of Marie de Gournay

See also 
Protofeminism
Feminism

References

External links 
Égalité des hommes et des femmes by Marie de Gournay, in French 
Grief des dames by Marie de Gournay, in French 

Works accessible on Gallica's website
Biography 
Project Continua: Biography of Marie de Gournay  Project Continua is a web-based multimedia resource dedicated to the creation and preservation of women's intellectual history from the earliest surviving evidence into the 21st Century.
 Querelle | Marie de Gournay  Querelle.ca is a website devoted to the works of authors contributing to the pro-woman side of the querelle des femmes.

1565 births
1645 deaths
Writers from Paris
French Roman Catholics
French nobility
French women novelists
French essayists
French women essayists
17th-century French women writers
17th-century French writers
French feminist writers
Latin–French translators
Feminism and history
Burials at Saint-Eustache, Paris
16th-century philosophers
17th-century philosophers
French women philosophers
French philosophers
16th-century French novelists
17th-century French novelists